The Hôtel Max Hallet is an Art Nouveau town house at 346, avenue Louise/Louizalaan in Brussels, Belgium, designed by Victor Horta.

See also

 Art Nouveau in Brussels
 History of Brussels
 Belgium in "the long nineteenth century"

References

Notes

Houses in Belgium
City of Brussels
Art Nouveau architecture in Brussels
Victor Horta buildings
Art Nouveau houses